Arthur Frederick Dobbs (31 March 1876 – 16 February 1955) was a Unionist politician in Northern Ireland.

Born at Castle Dobbs, County Antrim, Dobbs studied at Wellington College, Berkshire, and King's College, Cambridge. During World War I, he served as a major with the Howitzer Battery. In 1921, he served as High Sheriff of Antrim. From 1929 to 1933, he was an Ulster Unionist Party member of the Senate of Northern Ireland; he was re-elected in 1937 and served until his death in 1955.

References

1876 births
1955 deaths
Alumni of King's College, Cambridge
British Army personnel of World War I
Dobbs family
High Sheriffs of Antrim
Members of the Senate of Northern Ireland 1929–1933
Members of the Senate of Northern Ireland 1937–1941
Members of the Senate of Northern Ireland 1941–1945
Members of the Senate of Northern Ireland 1945–1949
Members of the Senate of Northern Ireland 1949–1953
Members of the Senate of Northern Ireland 1953–1957
Military personnel from County Antrim
People educated at Wellington College, Berkshire
Royal Artillery officers
Ulster Unionist Party members of the Senate of Northern Ireland